The Solomon Islands women's national under-20 football team is the highest women's youth team of women's football in the Solomon Islands and is controlled by the Solomon Islands Football Federation (SIFF).

History
The Solomon Islands is known as one of the best footballing countries in the Pacific. However, that counts for the men's. The women's are still far behind. The Women's under-20 team participated just two times so far at the OFC U-20 Women's Championship: in 2004 and 2006. In both of these tournament they managed to get a draw: a 0–0 against Papua New Guinea and a 1–1 against Melanesian rivals Vanuatu. They suffered there biggest loss in 2004: a 13–0 loss against Australia. So far the Solomon Islands under-20 team has never won a single game. However, in 2019 they will get a new chance as they will participate again.

OFC Championship Record

Current squad
The following players were called up for the 2019 OFC U-19 Women's Championship from 30 August–12 September in Avarua, the Cook Islands.

Caps and goals updated as of 6 September 2019, after the game against the Cook Islands.

Recent call-ups
The following players have been called up for the team in the last 12 months.

References

Oceanian women's national under-20 association football teams
women's